Saragosa may refer to:
Manuela Saragosa
Marcelo Saragosa
Saragosa, Texas

See also
Saragossa (disambiguation)